Little Finborough is a small village in Suffolk, England about  south-west of Stowmarket. It neighbours the village Great Finborough. The settlement was formerly known as ‘Finborough Parva’ and is featured in the Domesday Book. Notable buildings include St Mary's Church and Little Finborough Hall.

References
 William White, History, Gazetteer, and Directory of Suffolk, and the Towns Near Its Borders (1844).

External links

 St Mary, Little Finborough
 Church of St Mary Images of England

Villages in Suffolk
Mid Suffolk District
Civil parishes in Suffolk